INS Anvesh (formerly known as the DRDO Technology Demonstration Vessel), is a missile range instrumentation ship (also termed as a "Floating Test Range" (FTR)) built for the Indian Navy. Designed by the Defence Research and Development Organisation (DRDO) and built by Cochin Shipyard Limited (CSL), the ship was conceived to serve as a sea-based platform for India's ballistic missile defence program. The ship was designed by Vik-Sandvik Design India Pvt Ltd (“VSDI”).

Construction 

The construction of the then-DRDO Technology Demonstration Vessel was awarded to the Cochin Shipyard Limited (CSL) by the DRDO - India's premier agency for R&D in defence, in August 2015.  This vessel has a length of 118.4 metre, 20 metre width and 7.1 metre draft and having a steel weight of approximately 3900 tons.

The original contract for the construction of the vessel was with Bharati Shipyard, but time overruns forced by the yard's poor finances led to termination of the contract. Subsequently, the Cochin Shipyard won the bid to execute this project.

Steel plate cutting of the vessel was started on 10 August 2016. Dr S Christopher, Chairman, DRDO and Secretary, Department of Defence R&D, launched the mega block assembly of hull blocks of the ship (Ship No.20) on 27 January 2016 at CSL.

The ceremonial event of commencement of Mega Block Assembly of hull blocks of Ship No.20, the Technology Demonstration Vessel, being built for the Defence Research & Development Organisation (DRDO), Government of India was held on 27 Jan 2017 at CSL. 

It is now being reported that the ship will commence the sea trial in September 2021 and will be commissioned by the end of 2021.  DRDO has specific plans to use the vessel, equipped with electro-optical missile tracking, S-band radar tracking, telemetry devices apart from a launch pad, control and mission control center, for testing its phase II of Ballistic Missile Defence (BMD) interceptor missiles. The phase II of the BMD envisages intercepting and destroying enemy missile up to range of 5000 kilometers by kinetic force with the FTR allowing live testing of the interdictor missiles and not computer simulations.

Commissioning 

The ship had been quietly commissioned by  National Security Advisor Ajit Doval on an unknown date. A photo of the commissioning ceremony has been made public for the first time in the Indian Navy Song 2022: 'Hum Taiyyar hain'.

See also 
 INS Dhruv
 Strategic Forces Command
 Future of the Indian Navy
 Indian Ballistic Missile Defense Programme

References 

Missile range instrumentation ships
Maritime vessels related to spaceflight
Research vessels
Research vessels of India
Rockets and missiles
Signals intelligence
Defence Research and Development Organisation